Sevenmile Creek is a stream in the U.S. state of Wisconsin. It is a tributary to the Wisconsin River.

Sevenmile Creek was so named for its distance,  from the original Grand Rapids townsite. The name sometimes is spelled out "Seven Mile Creek".

References

Rivers of Wood County, Wisconsin
Rivers of Wisconsin